Rao Rao Mosque is one of the oldest mosques in Indonesia located in Nagari Rao Rao, Tarab River, Tanah Datar Regency, West Sumatra. It is located on the road from Batusangkar bound to Bukittinggi, precisely in Rao Rao. This mosque of Minangkabau and Persian architecture was built in 1908 with a roof made from fibers before being changed to zinc.

Since its foundation, the mosque has suffered significant damage due to earthquakes, as in 1926 and 2009. But since its construction, the mosque has never been massively restored. The renovations that have been made are only repair of tilting of the minaret in 1975 and the replacement of all the old ceramics with the new one around the 1990s.

Currently, apart from being used for Islamic worship activities, this one-floor mosque is also used as a place of religious education. Previously, the mosque was also used as a strategy center during the Indonesian War of Independence against the Dutch colonial rule.

History 
The mosque was built in 1908, as a replacement of the Atap Ijuk Mosque in Rao Rao which was demolished due to the unfeasible condition of the building. Thereafter, on the land of waqf (endowment) by H. Mohammad Thaib Caniago, the mosque was built jointly by Nagari Rao Rao community on the initiative of Abdurrachman Datuk Majo Indo. Construction was completed by the end of 1918.

Architecture 

Architectural style of the mosque is a blend of various elements, mostly Minangkabau and Persian. Resembling to other Minangkabau mosques, roof of the mosque consists of four layers that are slightly curved, and there is a square room with four rooftops gilded toward the four corners of the wind at the top level of the roof, while there is a large space with the domes in the minaret.

Inside the prayer hall, four main pillars made of concrete stand. There is a newer section of the mosque which was built in the 1930s, decorated with ornaments of broken glass. The minbar has an area of 3 × 1.38 meters.

In the 100th anniversary of the Rao Rao Mosque in October 2008, Shodiq Pasadigoe, the regent of Tanah Datar at that time, said there were two other mosques throughout West Sumatra that resembled this mosque because it was asked to be built similarly, namely the Mosque of Saadah which is also located in Tarab River, Tanah Datar Regency and Koto Baru Grand Mosque in Pagu River, South Solok Regency.

Related building 

There is a two-story building measuring 7 x 10 m standing to the left of the mosque. The building called "Markaz" was completed in 2001. Meanwhile there is a building used as a religious school to the right of the mosque as well, which had changed its name to "Darul Huda" since 1982 (formerly Madrasah Islamiyah).

See also 

 Koto Baru Grand Mosque
 List of oldest mosques in Indonesia
 Vernacular mosque architecture in Indonesia

References 
 Footnotes

 Bibliography

External links 
 Masjid Raya Rao Rao Official website of Rao Rao Mosque

Buildings and structures in West Sumatra
Cultural Properties of Indonesia in West Sumatra
Mosques completed in 1918
Mosques in Indonesia
Tourist attractions in West Sumatra